Polsat is a Polish free-to-air television channel that was launched on 5 December 1992 by Zygmunt Solorz-Żak. , it is the most watched television channel in Poland with a market share of 11.30%

Polsat belongs to Grupa Polsat Plus (WSE: CPS), which also owns other channels.

On 27 February 2019, the longest-running graphic design (2006–2019) was changed to a new one, but the station's logo remained virtually unchanged until 2021 when the logo was changed again as part of a major overhaul; however, the sun concept of the logo has remained.

History 
Polsat began test transmissions on 1 December 1992, and started regular broadcasts on 5 December 1992 at 16:30 CET via the Eutelsat II-F3 satellite. The first programme broadcast by Polsat was the Polish animated series Wędrówki Pyzy (pl). To circumvent licensing issues, it originally broadcast from a studio in Hilversum (the Netherlands) and imported programming had to come by plane. Its initial broadcasting reach was very small at only 20% of the population, but was considered to be attractive for advertisers, as most of its viewers were found in larger cities, had a significant overrepresentation of under-50s and had higher incomes. The owner and main founder of the channel, Zygmunt Solorz-Żak, originally planned that after the regulation of radio and television regulations, the television headquarters would be located in Wrocław, but ultimately they were located in Warsaw.

In the summer of 1993 a group of 9 young journalists working in the Polsat TV newsroom established the first independent news program in Central and Eastern Europe broadcasting live every evening, Informacje. In the core team of journalists were Jaroslaw Sellin, Pawel Maciag, Tadeusz Swiechowicz and Adam Pawlowicz.

On 5 October 1993, Polsat finally obtained a legal license from the Polish National Broadcasting Council to broadcast terrestrially in Poland, and began free-to-air terrestrial transmissions on 27 January 1994. Polsat therefore became the first Polish TV channel to break the monopoly previously held by TVP.

Polsat initially broadcast its program in two blocks, afternoon (16:30 to 19:00) and night (23:15 to about 01:00). The channel broadcast for 4 hours and then 8 hours a day (from 16:30 to about 01:00). On October 1, 1994, it increased its daily airtime to 16 hours a day. From September 6, 1999 to the end of 2009, it broadcast 23 hours a day (6:00 - 5:00). From the beginning of 2010, the program is broadcast around the clock, but once a month at 1:00 a.m. the channel shuts down for maintenance.

In 1999 Pawel Maciag became the first United States correspondent for Polsat TV based in New York City. As an eyewitness, he covered the tragic events of 9/11 from Ground Zero in New York. 

From September 15, 2020, the Polsat TV signal is broadcast on the Internet by the broadcaster's VOD Polsat Go and Polsat Box Go internet services.

From the very beginning, events, concerts and galas were also broadcast. New Year's Eve music concerts have been broadcast since 2006, and in 2015–2019 and from 2021 - Polsat SuperHit Festival. In 1996–2002, the National Dance Music Festival in Ostróda was broadcast (mainly as part of Disco Polo Live), in 1999 - the Telekamera gala, and occasionally Polsat's anniversary gala.

Branding

The name Polsat was thought up by Polish satirist Tadeusz Drozda, at a time when the channel broadcast from the Netherlands by satellite. The first logo, made up of an S formed by two arches, and to the left the word POLSAT divided in two separate syllables (with the second below the first) was designed by Jacek Błach, and the music for the ident was composed by Grzegorz Ciechowski. In 1994, after achieving its terrestrial license, the channel rebranded and adopted a sun as its logo. In an interview given to Super Express in 2011, Zygmunt Solorz-Żak was believed to be "superstitious", with the sun being created by a friend - the golden Aztec sun - to assure the success of the channel. The first logo was designed by Jacek Błach and the ident music was composed by Grzegorz Ciechowski.

On 27 February 2006, Polsat changed its logo and graphic design, replacing the blue look. The logo shows of a sun putted inside an orange square with shining stripes, and the red square with the text “POLSAT”. The idents font is FF DIN (also used on RTL).

Polsat and its thematic sister channels started to show elements of rebranding from 2 August 2021. The Polsat channels officially changed their logos and graphic design on 30 August 2021.

Polsat HD 
A high-definition simulcast feed of Polsat HD was launched in 1 September 2009.

Programming 

Among its shows are a variety of Polish and American dramas and news.

Entertainment 
 Idol - Polish version of Pop Idol (2002-2005 and since 2017, 5 seasons)
 Dancing with the stars. Taniec z gwiazdami (from season 14th) – Polish version of Dancing with the stars (since 2014, 8 seasons) Earlier in TVN.
 Twoja twarz brzmi znajomo – Polish version of Your Face Sounds Familiar (since 2014, 10 seasons)
 Tylko nas Dwoje Polish version of Just the two of Us (since 2010, 1 seasons)
 The Four Bitwa o sławę - Polish version of The Four (since 2020, 1 seasons)
 The Brain. Genialny umysł - Polish version of The Brain (since 2017, 2 seasons)
 Supermodelka Plus Size - Polish version of Curvy Supermodel (since 2017, 1 season)
 Wyspa przetrwania - Polish version of Koh-Lanta (since 2017, 1 season)
 Nasz nowy dom (since 2013, 9 seasons)
 Top Chef – Polish version of Top Chef (since 2013, 7 seasons)
 Hell's Kitchen. Piekielna Kuchnia – Polish version of Hell's Kitchen (since 2014, 6 seasons)
 My3 – Polish version of Dutch TV series Iedereen K3 (since 2017, 3 seasons)

Information/Talk show/Reporters 
 Wydarzenia (Events) – news (since 2004)
 Nowy dzień (New Day) - daily morning news program of Polsat News, also broadcast in Polsat from 6:00 to 9:00 every day (since 2008)
 Graffiti - morning political talk show of Polsat News (in Polsat: 1994-2004, 2008 and since 2018)
 Interwencja (Intervention) – reporters magazine (since 2003)
 Państwo w państwie (State within a state) – also in Polsat News (since 2011)

TV series 
 Pierwsza miłość (First love) – TV soap; which has been redubbed as Soupy Norman in Ireland (since 2004, 13 seasons, 2517 episodes)
 Przyjaciółki (Friends [women]) – drama series (since 2012, 10 seasons, 122 episodes)
 W rytmie serca - drama series (since 2017, 12 episodes)
 Ślad (Trace) - crime drama series; Polish version of Russian series Sled (since 2018)
 Świat według Kiepskich (The World According to the Kiepscy) – sitcom (since 1999, 30 seasons, 528 episodes)
 Malanowski i partnerzy (Malanowski & partners) – docudrama crime series (since 2009, 807 episodes)
 Trudne sprawy (Difficult issues) – docudrama series (since 2011, 631 episodes)
 Dlaczego ja? (Why me?) (since 2010, 1197 episodes)
 Pamiętniki z wakacji (Holiday diaries) (2011–2013, 2016, 61 episodes)
 Zdrady (Infidelities) – docudrama series (since 2013, 87 episodes)

Sports 
 European Qualifiers (for the UEFA Euro 2016 and 2018 FIFA World Cup) - matches of the Poland national football team
 Polish Cup in football (only finals)
 FIVB Volleyball World League
 2017 Men's European Volleyball Championship
 2018 FIVB Volleyball Men's World Championship
 Konfrontacja Sztuk Walki

Previously on Polsat

Entertainment 
 Idź na całość – Polish version of Let's Make a Deal (1997–2001)
 Jak oni śpiewają – Polish version of Soapstar Superstar (2007–2009, 6 seasons)
 Fabryka gwiazd – the Polish version of Star Academy (2008, 1 season)
 Gwiezdny cyrk – Polish version of Celebrity Circus (2008, 1 season)
 Moment prawdy – Polish version of The Moment of Truth (2009–2010, 2 seasons)
 Światowe Rekordy Guinnessa (2009–2011)
 Stand up. Zabij mnie śmiechem (2010, 1 season)
 Chciwość czyli Żądza Pieniądza (2001, 1 season) – Polish version of Greed
 Must Be the Music. Tylko muzyka – Polish version of Must Be the Music (2011 — 2016, 11 seasons)
 Got to Dance. Tylko taniec – Polish version of Got to Dance (2012–2014, 4 seasons)
 SuperDzieciak – Polish version of Super Kids (2015, 1 season)
 Życiowa szansa – Polish version of It's Your Chance of a Lifetime (2000–2002)
 Piramida – Polish version of Pyramid (1997–1999)
 Awantura o kasę (2002–2005)
 Grasz czy nie grasz – Polish version of Deal or no deal (2005–2007)
 Gra w ciemno (2005–2007)
 Quizmania – Polish version of the English Participation TV show
 Kabaret na żywo – Cabaret show

Information 
 Informacje (1993–2004)

Political talk shows 
 Co z tą Polską? (2004–2007)
 Polityczne graffiti
 Dorota Gawryluk – konfrontacje

TV series 
 Niania w wielkim mieście (2017)
 Skazane (2015)
 Na krawędzi (2013)
 Na krawędzi 2 (2014)
 Czułość i kłamstwa (1999–2000)
 Adam i Ewa (2000–2001)
 Zostać Miss (2001–2003)
 Psie serce (2002)
 Samo życie (2002–2010)
 Pensjonat pod Różą (2004–2006)
 Tango z aniołem (2005)
 Kochaj mnie, kochaj (2006)
 Będziesz moja (2006)
 Tylko miłość (2007–2009)
 Szpilki na Giewoncie (2010–2012)
 Linia życia (2011)
 Hotel 52 (2010–2013)
 To nie koniec świata! (2013–2014)
 Fala zbrodni (2003–2008)
 Prawo miasta (2007)
 Ekipa (2007)
 13 Posterunek (1997–1998)
 Graczykowie (1999–2002)
 Miodowe lata – licensed from The Honeymooners (1998–2003)
 Całkiem nowe lata miodowe – licensed from The Honeymooners (2004)
 Rodzina zastępcza (1999–2009)
 Szpital na perypetiach (2001–2003)
 Daleko od noszy (2003–2009)
 Daleko od noszy 2 (2010–2011)
 Daleko od noszy – szpital futpolowy (2011)
 Daleko od noszy - reanimacja (2017)
 Mamuśki (2007)
 I kto tu rządzi? – licensed from Who's the Boss? (2007–2008)
 Synowie (2009)
 Synowie, czyli po moim trupie! (2009)
 Ludzie Chudego – licensed from Los hombres de Paco (2010–2011)

References

External links
 
Cyfrowy Polsat channel list
List of Polsat's programs

 
Television channels in Poland
Television channels and stations established in 1992
1992 establishments in Poland
Polish-language television stations
Mass media in Warsaw